Kirthi Nissanka Seneviratne (22 November 1929 - 10 August 1986) was a Sri Lankan academic and physician. He was a Professor of Physiology and founding director of Sri Lanka's Postgraduate Institute of Medicine.

Educated at the Royal College, Colombo where he won the Arunachchalam Prize and graduated with a MBBS with honours in 1954 from the University of Ceylon, Colombo  and went on to gain his PhD from the University of Edinburgh. His brother, Nihal, was a former Secretary General of Parliament.

Joining the academic staff of the University of Ceylon's Medical Faculty in 1957 as a demonstrator, he went on the became a Professor of Physiology. In 1974 he establish the Institute of Postgraduate Medicine, which later became the Postgraduate Institute of Medicine. He was also a reservist Captain in the Sri Lanka Army.

See also
University of Ceylon

External links

1929 births
1986 deaths
Sinhalese academics
Sinhalese physicians
Alumni of Royal College, Colombo
Alumni of the University of Ceylon (Colombo)
Academic staff of the University of Colombo
Alumni of the University of Edinburgh
Sri Lanka Army Medical Corps officers